The ferry fiasco is a term that refers to an ongoing Scottish political controversy relating to the construction of two ferries,  and Hull 802, by Ferguson Marine Ltd, for the state-owned ferry operator Caledonian MacBrayne under direction of Caledonian Maritime Assets Ltd (CMAL), Transport Scotland, and the Scottish Government. The project has suffered from major delays, and costs have trebled to £293 million.The main contractor, Ferguson Marine, was nationalised by the Scottish Government in December 2019 with debts of £70 million. It is now classified as an executive non-departmental public body of the Scottish Government.

Caledonian MacBrayne ("CalMac") operate in the Clyde and Hebrides regions of the west coast of Scotland, and which serve a local population of around 45,000 people. There are no other large scale  ferry operators in the area. Many of its routes are considered "lifeline services" which run to 22 of the 'major' west-coast islands. On average its 34 vessels complete 466 crossings a day. 

Delays and cancellations in recent years have been blamed by CalMac on ageing ferries, with the average age of their vessels being 24 years. Research shows the replacement of ferries fell from one every 14 months from 1993 to 2007 (with 33,350 tonnes launched), to one every 36.1 months from 2007 to 2021 (with 16,188 tonnes launched).



Procurement process
The last shipyard on the lower River Clyde, Ferguson Marine Ltd, went into administration in 2014. In August of that year, then First Minister of Scotland Alex Salmond brokered a deal with industrialist Jim McColl to buy the business. A year later the business was awarded a £97 million contract to build two ferries to serve the Isle of Arran, replacing , and the second to sail between Skye, North Uist and Harris. Inverclyde SNP MP Ronnie Cowan described this decision as "just reward" for the investment McColl had made in Ferguson Marine. Ferguson Marine was announced as the preferred bidder on 31 August 2015 to coincide with an announcement from the UK Government about a £500 million expansion of the Royal Navy's nuclear submarine base at nearby Faslane.

At the time there were concerns that Ferguson Marine had not built any ferries of this size in the recent past. A new management team had recently been installed, and they too had no experience of building a ferry of this size. The finances of Ferguson Marine were so tight that they told the Scottish Government they could not provide the financial guarantees that were stipulated in the contract. These guarantees would make the shipbuilder responsible for any cost overruns. Of the six shipyards that tendered to build the ferries, Ferguson Marine put forward the most expensive bid, at £37 million more than the cheapest.

As contract negotiations between the Statutory Harbour Authority Caledonian Maritime Assets Ltd ("CMAL") - owner of 16 ports and harbours in the Clyde and Islands - and Ferguson Marine were concluding in September 2015, the chairman of CMAL, Erik Ostergard criticised the process, ongoing costs and the lack of Ferguson Marine's track record in projects of this nature. Ostergard was granted a letter from Scottish Ministers absolving his organisation of blame should the deal go bad. CMAL's preference was to restart the procurement process. On 9th October Transport Scotland informed CMAL that, after due consideration, Scottish ministers were aware of the risks but content to proceed to award the contract.

The contract was formally awarded to Ferguson Marine at the Scottish National Party Conference in Aberdeen on 16 October 2015. The announcement was made by Derek Mackay who was then a junior minister responsible for Transport and Islands.

Controversy 
In September 2022, the BBC obtained documents indicating that Ferguson Marine received preferential treatment in the procurement process. CMAL held an in-person meeting with Ferguson, which was not extended to other bidders. Ferguson also uniquely received a 424-page document from a design consultant setting out CalMac's technical requirements, which was not extended to other bidders, who had to rely on a more limited 125-page specification. A key section of Ferguson's bid was largely copied from this longer document.  Ferguson was also allowed to significantly change its design halfway through the tender by developing a variant mentioned but discounted in its original submission.  This change allowed it to reduce its price by nearly £10 million.

Design and build
When designed, it was decided that the two ferries would use both marine diesel and liquified natural gas, which was a new concept for the region, and would allow the ferries to have lower emissions and allow operators flexibility over fuel sourcing and fuel costs.  Another requirement was that the ferries would need larger bow thrusters and a stern thruster to make them more manoeuvrable in dock. Liquefied natural gas needs to be stored at -162 °C and the required tanks and bow thrusters meant each ferry being 200 tonnes heavier than an equivalent vessel.

Within two months of the contract being awarded CMAL alerted problems at Ferguson Marine to the Project Steering Group (PSG).  The PSG was chaired by Transport Scotland and also included representatives from CMAL and CalMac and provided oversight of the project. CMAL reported that Ferguson Marine failed to provide a detailed plan for building the ferries, failed to assign the correct workforce resources, quality issues were becoming apparent, and that there was lack of space at the shipyard. CMAL could not intervene with the shipbuilder's handling of the project and could not prevent them from starting construction of the vessels before designs were finalised. During this time Transport Scotland only provided verbal updates on the project to Scottish Ministers.

Delays 
The contract for the ships stipulated that Ferguson Marine had to submit individual sets of drawings at least 30 days prior to work starting, as CMAL needed approval from Lloyds Register. Ferguson Marine reported that the requirement for CMAL to sign off every drawing slowed progress down and it could take several months for the shipbuilder to process CMAL's comments on the individual drawings. The shipbuilder reported that it had to engage in out-of-sequence working to try to keep the project moving so it prioritised constructing the vessels to meet the milestone dates. Despite not having an approved design steel was cut on the on 15 December 2015 in line with the contractual date. CMAL's onsite team identified problems during construction and issued reports to Ferguson Marine's management outlining their concerns and recommendations. The shipbuilder considered some of recommendations unnecessary and adding to costs and delays. CMAL could not direct the builder to respond and by the time they went into administration only 52 per cent of the issues had been resolved. From 2016 Ferguson Marine experienced cash flow problems which it blamed on problems with the contract. The Scottish Government approved a series of financial support and loans. Audit Scotland subsequently found that although this financial support allowed the shipbuilder to retain its workforce, it did little to impact on the progress of the vessels.The delays got worse as the project progressed. By November 2017, when First Minister Nicola Sturgeon launched Glen Sannox, the ship (which was supposed to be in service by mid-2018) was 431 days behind schedule. At launch windows had been painted on, the funnel was not operational and the bulbous bow, though present, was made from flat sheet steel and had been rejected by an inspector from Lloyd's Register as requiring to be renewed in its entirety. The BBC claimed that these items had been fitted so that the builder could claim one of 15 "milestone payments" (to culminate in the final payment of £97 million on delivery of the ferries) from the Scottish Government. As of February 2023 the ferry is not yet in service.

Ferguson Marine went into administration in August 2019. The construction of both hulls continued to be marked by repeated delays and mechanical issues after nationalisation. A turnaround director, Tim Hair, was appointed between August 2019 and July 2021: he brought improvements to the yard and created 100 jobs, but there was criticism of the £1.2 million paid in fees to secure his services. 

Covid-19 further hampered construction, which was stopped for 11 weeks and initially opened with less than 10% of its workforce, who had to work with social distancing measures. It emerged that the Scottish Government had paid a further £49 million from Covid Support Funds to Ferguson Marine.

Further delays in 2022 
In February 2022, at least 400 electrical cables installed aboard Glen Sannox were found to be too short to reach equipment. By the end of September 2022, only 26% of cables had been replaced. CMAL warned; "The current rate at which cable is pulled presents a serious threat to the project". In April 2022 Dr Spyros Hirdaris, a professor of maritime safety from Helsinki where the engine manufacturer Wartsila is based, stated that there was a high possibility that the engines would not work, as they had sat idle for six years.  In November of the same year Ferguson Marine announced the ferries would rely on diesel alone for an unquantified period as they required bespoke vacuum sensors, with a lead-term of 36 weeks for delivery, in order to comply with refrigerated LNG regulations.

In May 2022 Jim McColl blamed the Scottish government for the problems with the contract, however Nicola Sturgeon claimed that the contract had saved 400 jobs. In the meantime island community groups said the continued disruption and unreliability of ferry services had left them in a critical situation. In the year to March 2021, Caledonian MacBrayne had been fined £3.2 million by Transport Scotland for delays, whilst on occasion ferry customers became aggressive after service disruption following ferry breakdowns.

As of December 2022 Glen Sannox is expected to be delivered five years behind schedule, between March and May 2023. Its unnamed sister ship, Hull 802, is expected to be delivered in the first quarter of 2024. Both ships are also reported to be unlikely to operate their designated routes while the £130 million project to convert existing infrastructure in the ports to handle the new ferries remains incomplete; with (as of September 2022) the £40 million upgrade of Ardrossan's port, from which  will operate, yet to start due to complexities on how the bill will be split between Transport Scotland, the port's owner, and North Ayrshire council.  This is believed to lead to a further three years delay on the new ferry serving that route.

Delays lengthen in 2023 

In March 2023 the Ferguson Marine chief executive revealed additional delays: an "absolute deadline" of December 2023 for the first ship, though hoping for completion in the autumn, and the late summer of 2024 for the second ship.

Inquiries

The Scottish Parliament’s Rural Economy and Connectivity Committee published a report in December 2020 after a 12 month inquiry. The report branded the situation a “catastrophic failure” of management. Further inquiries are being made by the parliament’s Audit Committee and following a public petition, by the Net Zero, Energy and Transport Committee.

A report by Audit Scotland in March 2022 found the total cost to have risen to £240 million. Audit Scotland also found "insufficient evidence to explain why Scottish Ministers made [the] decision" to award the contract to Ferguson Marine. The Auditor General, Stephen Boyle, described his "frustration" at not being able to review all the documentation relating to the awarding of the contract for the two ferries.  Former SNP Deputy Leader Jim Sillars accused the Scottish Government of criminal "misconduct in public office" and lodged a complaint to Police Scotland requesting they investigate the missing documents.  This call was later supported by the Scottish Conservatives transport minister Graham Simpson and SNP-led North Ayrshire Council, but Police Scotland confirmed they were not investigating the allegations.

Just before a Parliamentary debate on the contract, Jenny Gilruth, Scotland's junior transport minister, produced an email to show that the contract was ultimately approved by Derek Mackay, a disgraced previous junior transport minister who left the government in February 2020.  The same email trail showed that the final decision was escalated to John Swinney, the Deputy First Minister and Cabinet Finance Secretary, before the contract was finally awarded. Civil servants waited until he could be briefed before awarding the contract so he could check there were “no banana skins”. He confirmed that the contract should proceed. Swinney subsequently claimed he was only providing "budget approval", rather than approval for the contract itself, as there would be “significant inefficiency” in Government if a senior Cabinet Minister was involved in approving every contract. Keith Brown, the then Cabinet Secretary for the Economy, signed the contract on behalf of the Scottish Government, but he also denied responsibility claiming to sign in lieu of Mackay who was on holiday at the time.

In a written response to the Public Audit Committee, Mackay said that he had "confidence" in the recommendation, and that there was expectation the contract would receive "sufficient monitoring and oversight".  Scottish Conservatives transport spokesman Graham Simpson called for a public inquiry into the fiasco. Nicola Sturgeon told the Scottish Parliament, the "buck stops with me", claiming "lessons will be learned".  She promised a full review but stopped short of a public inquiry.

In September 2022, Transport Scotland published a report by consultants Ernst and Young called “Project Neptune” which concluded that having multiple state agencies involved in the procurement process led to confusion over roles and responsibilities. The report suggested introducing a possible “Ferries Commissioner”, but added this could cause further confusion with “another stakeholder in an already crowded sector”.

Following the BBC's disclosure of documents suggesting that Ferguson Marine had benefited from preferential treatment in the procurement process, John Swinney told the Scottish Parliament on 27 September 2022 that Audit Scotland would again investigate the issue.

By the end of September 2022, the cost estimates from Ferguson Marine to put both ferries into service had risen by another £100 million to a total of £340 million. John Swinney stated that “no decision” would be made to release more public money towards the cost of completing the ferries until "due diligence" was carried out by the Scottish Government on the company, supported by external, independent financial advisors.  It was announced that Nicola Sturgeon would give evidence to the Public Audit Committee in November 2022. There, she "completely and utterly" refuted there was anything untoward in the procurement process, but that there were powerful arguments in favour of Ferguson Marine given it was the last shipbuilder on the lower Clyde and thousands of jobs were at stake.

In late November 2022, Audit Scotland announced that it was unable to account for £128.25 million in public money spent by Ferguson Marine on the ferries. Furthermore, it was unable to trace how a £30 million Scottish Government loan to Ferguson was spent.

References

External links
Scottish Parliament's Net Zero, Energy and Transport Committee: A modern and sustainable ferry service for Scotland
Transport Scotland: An introduction to Project Neptune

Scottish Government
Politics of Scotland
Political scandals in Scotland